Elbląg is a Polish parliamentary constituency in the Warmian-Masurian Voivodeship.  It elects eight members of the Sejm.

The district has the number '34' for elections to the Sejm and is named after the city of Elbląg.  It includes the counties of Bartoszyce, Braniewo, Działdowo, Elbląg, Iława, Lidzbark, Nowe Miasto, and Ostróda, and the city county of Elbląg.

List of members

Sejm

Footnotes

Electoral districts of Poland
Warmian-Masurian Voivodeship
Elbląg